John Watts McCormick (December 20, 1831 – June 25, 1917) was an American politician who served one term as a U.S. Representative from Ohio from 1883 to 1885,

Biography
Born near Gallipolis, Ohio, he was the son of John R. and Sarah Wadell McCormick. McCormick attended Ohio Wesleyan University in Delaware, Ohio, and the Ohio University at Athens.
He engaged in agricultural pursuits and stock raising.
He taught school and later became a Methodist minister.
He served as delegate to the Ohio constitutional convention in 1873.

Congress 
McCormick was elected as a Republican to the Forty-eighth Congress (March 4, 1883 – March 3, 1885).
He was an unsuccessful candidate for reelection in 1884 to the Forty-ninth Congress.
Trustee of Rio Grande College 1883-1885.

Later career and death 
He resumed agricultural pursuits.
He died in Gallipolis, Ohio, June 25, 1917.
He was interred in Mount Zion Cemetery near Gallipolis, Ohio.

He married first to Caroline Miles, and later to Sarah Miles.

References

External links

1831 births
1917 deaths
People from Gallipolis, Ohio
Ohio Constitutional Convention (1873)
Ohio University alumni
Ohio Wesleyan University alumni
19th-century American politicians
Republican Party members of the United States House of Representatives from Ohio